Camaret is part of the name of two communes in France:

 Camaret-sur-Aigues, in the Vaucluse département
 Camaret-sur-Mer, in the Finistère département